Ukrainian Academy of Sciences (UAN; Українська академія наук) is a public organization that positions itself as an association of scientists and production workers of Ukraine. Founded in 1991. It is the legal successor of the Ukrainian Academy of Sciences of National Progress.

According to an experiment conducted by journalist Irina Kovalenko in February 2017, one can get a certificate of a “member of the Ukrainian Academy of Sciences” by paying “for a vacancy” an amount equivalent to $300.

UAN includes structures (for example, military-cossack department) that are called "funny" in the media.

References

Notes

Sources
 В Украине создали фейковую "академию наук" и раздают дипломы

1991 establishments in Ukraine
Professional associations based in Ukraine
Scientific organizations based in Ukraine
Unaccredited institutions of higher learning